Mount Helen is a mountain located in British Columbia, Canada. Its height is approximately 2.3 km.

External links
 

Two-thousanders of British Columbia
Canadian Rockies
Peace River Land District